Walter Mai (born 13 May 1936) is a German sailor. He competed in the Finn event at the 1972 Summer Olympics.

References

External links
 

1936 births
Living people
German male sailors (sport)
Olympic sailors of West Germany
Sailors at the 1972 Summer Olympics – Finn
Sportspeople from Prague